Baeospora myosura, commonly known as conifer-cone baeospora, is a species of fungus that produces mushrooms with long, coarse hairs. It grows on plant material and manure. It is white to cream and the spore color is white, cream, or yellowish. It is commonly found in North America and Europe.  The common name of the mushroom is conifercone cap. It was described in 1938 by mycologist Rolf Singer. It is regarded as nonpoisonous.

References

Marasmiaceae
Fungi of Europe
Fungi of North America
Fungi described in 1938
Taxa named by Rolf Singer